Paradeudorix ituri, the Ituri fairy playboy, is a butterfly in the family Lycaenidae. It is found in Nigeria, Cameroon, Equatorial Guinea, Gabon, the Republic of the Congo, the Central African Republic, the Democratic Republic of the Congo, Sudan, Uganda, Kenya and Tanzania. The habitat consists of primary forests.

Subspecies
Paradeudorix ituri ituri (Nigeria: east and the Cross River loop, Cameroon, Bioko, Gabon, Congo, Central African Republic, Democratic Republic of the Congo: Mongala, Uele, Tshopo, Tshuapa, Equateur, Sankuru and Maniema)
Paradeudorix ituri ugandae (Talbot, 1935) (southern Sudan, western Uganda, western Kenya, north-western Tanzania)

References

External links
Die Gross-Schmetterlinge der Erde 13: Die Afrikanischen Tagfalter. Plate XIII 66 a

Butterflies described in 1908
Deudorigini